The International Racquetball Federation's 17th Racquetball World Championships were held in Burlington, Ontario, Canada, from June 14 to 21, 2014. This was the second time Worlds were in Canada. Previously, they were in Montreal in 1992.

The men's doubles final was between two surprise finalists, as neither the #1 seeded USA team of Ben Croft and Tom Fuhrmann nor #2 seeds Mexicans Alvaro Beltran and Edson Martinez made the final. In fact, the Mexicans didn't even make the podium.

Instead, Colombians Sebastian Franco and Alejandro Herrera defeated Canadians Mike Green and Vincent Gagnon in the final, 15-11, 15-5, which was the first Men's doubles World Championship not won by either the USA or Mexico. The Canadians had defeated the Colombians in two straight games in the round robin stage of play, but Colombia was able to reverse that result in the final.

Franco and Herrera defeated Beltran and Martinez in the quarter-finals, denying the Mexicans a place on the podium, and then beat Bolivians Conrrado Moscoso and Mario Mercado in the semi-finals. Green and Gagnon beat Americans Croft and Fuhrmann in the other semi-final. Croft won gold in Men's doubles (with Mitch Williams) at his previous appearance at Worlds in 2010.

Tournament format
The 2014 World Championships was the first competition with an initial round robin stage that was used to seed players for an elimination qualification round. Previously, players were seeded into an elimination round based on how their countries had done at previous World Championships, and then a second team competition was also played.

Round robin

Pool A
Source

Pool B

Pool C

Pool D

Pool E

Elimination round
Source

References

2014 Racquetball World Championships